David J. Wilson (1880–1926) was a Scottish amateur footballer who played in the Scottish League for Queen's Park as an inside right. While playing for Queen's Park, he scored the first ever goal at the third (current) Hampden Park, in 1903. He scored two goals on his sole appearance for Scotland in 1900.

Personal life 
Wilson served as a second lieutenant in the Argyll and Sutherland Highlanders during the First World War. A Glasgow solicitor, he died in 1926.

References

External links
London Hearts profile (Scotland)
London Hearts profile (Scottish League)

1880 births
1926 deaths
Association football inside forwards
Scottish footballers
Scotland international footballers
Queen's Park F.C. players
Scottish Football League players
Scottish Football League representative players
British Army personnel of World War I
Argyll and Sutherland Highlanders officers